Meridulia chaenostium is a species of moth of the family Tortricidae that is endemic to Venezuela.

The ground colour of the forewings is cream brown, suffused with brown and sprinkled and dotted with dark brown. The markings are pale grey brown, dotted with blackish brown. The hindwings are cream with greyish strigulae and spots.
.

Etymology
The species name refers to the broadly opened ostial portion of the sterigma and is derived from Greek choane (meaning a funnel).

References

External links

Moths described in 2006
Endemic fauna of Venezuela
Tortricidae of South America
Euliini
Taxa named by Józef Razowski